Doris Gunnarsson  (born 1945) is a Swedish journalist and politician. She is a member of the Centre Party.

References

Centre Party (Sweden) politicians
Swedish journalists
1945 births
Living people